Widerad (died in 1075) was abbot of Fulda Abbey (in the Kingdom of Germany). His dispute over precedence with Bishop Hezilo of Hildesheim contributed to the loss of significant parts of the estates of the abbey.

References

Sources

Year of birth unknown

1075 deaths
Abbots of Fulda